Lophidius testaceus is a species of beetle in the family Carabidae, the only species in the genus Lophidius.

References

Lebiinae